Frank Raymond Radovich (born March 3, 1938) is an American former professional basketball player and college coach. Radovich was selected in the 1960 NBA draft by the St. Louis Hawks after a collegiate career at Indiana. He played for the Philadelphia Warriors in the 1961–62 NBA season. Radovich later coached the Georgia Southern University men's basketball team from 1967 to 1970, compiling a 48–24 overall record. He later earned a master's degree at Indiana University where he also served as a graduate assistant coach for one season.

College head coaching record

References

External links
Indiana Basketball Hall of Fame entry

1938 births
Living people
American men's basketball players
Basketball coaches from Indiana
Basketball players from Indiana
Forwards (basketball)
Georgia Southern Eagles men's basketball coaches
Indiana Hoosiers men's basketball coaches
Indiana Hoosiers men's basketball players
Philadelphia Warriors players
Sportspeople from Hammond, Indiana
St. Louis Hawks draft picks